The Katy Sun is a weekly newspaper distributed to more than 28,000 households in four ZIP codes, west of Houston, Texas, and south of the Katy Freeway.

References

External links

 

Newspapers published in Greater Houston
Fort Bend County, Texas
Weekly newspapers published in Texas